Pissi, Kombissiri is a village in the Kombissiri Department of Bazèga Province in central Burkina Faso. The village has a population of 875.

References

External links
Satellite map at Maplandia.com

Populated places in the Centre-Sud Region
Bazèga Province